The FIS Alpine World Ski Championships 1936 in alpine skiing were the sixth edition of the competition, organized by the International Ski Federation (FIS), and were held in Innsbruck, Austria in February 1936.

Medal summary

Men's events

Women's events

Medal table

References

1936 in alpine skiing
1936 in Austrian sport
1936
International sports competitions hosted by Austria
Alpine skiing competitions in Austria
February 1936 sports events